Jesse James is a 1939 American Western film directed by Henry King and starring Tyrone Power, Henry Fonda, Nancy Kelly and Randolph Scott. Written by Nunnally Johnson, the film is loosely based on the life of Jesse James, the outlaw from whom the film derives its name. The supporting cast features Henry Hull, John Carradine, Brian Donlevy, Jane Darwell and Lon Chaney, Jr.

The American Humane Association began to oversee filmmaking after a horse appeared to die when it was driven off a cliff on set. It has been described by the British Channel 4 website as being "notorious for its historical inaccuracy."

Plot 
A railroad representative named Barshee forces farmers to give up the land the railroad is going to go through, giving them $1 per acre (much less than fair price) for it. When they come to Jesse's home, Barshee is told by Jesse that his mother Mrs Samuels is the farm's owner.

Barshee repeatedly tries to force her into selling, until her other son Frank James gets involved. Frank fights and easily beats Barshee, but Jesse shoots Barshee in the hand, in self-defence. When arrest warrants are issued for Frank and Jesse, Major A. Rufus Cobb, an editor in nearby Liberty, Missouri and uncle of Zerelda (Zee) Cobb, Jesse's lover, quickly comes to tell them to leave.

Frank and Jesse learn that Barshee is responsible for the death of their mother and Jesse kills him in revenge. This begins Frank and Jesse's career as outlaws. They are pursued relentlessly by the unscrupulous railway boss, McCoy. Three years later, with a $5,000 reward on his head, Jesse marries Zee and turns himself in, at her insistence, having been promised a light sentence by Marshall Will Wright. But McCoy manages to manipulate the situation through his connections, by having the judge dismissed pre-trial, and installing a new judge, who is likely to favour McCoy's recommendation of imposing the death penalty for Jesse.

Frank breaks Jesse out of jail, and the James gang continue their life of crime. Eventually Zee leaves him, taking their son Jesse Jr. with her. Years later, following an unsuccessful robbery, a wounded Jesse returns home and Zee joins him in the belief that they will escape to California. Meanwhile, Bob Ford, an old member of the James gang, together with his brother Charlie Ford, contact Jesse, claiming that Frank sent them to ask Jesse to participate in their next robbery. They assert that the job will earn them all a large sum of money for very little risk. Jesse nevertheless refuses the Ford brothers' offer, and the brothers exit the house. However, sensing an opportunity to claim the generous reward for Jesse's death, Bob Ford sneaks back inside, and shoots Jesse in the back, thereby killing him.

Cast
Tyrone Power as Jesse James
Henry Fonda as Frank James
Nancy Kelly as Zerelda (Zee)
Randolph Scott as Will Wright
Henry Hull as Major Rufus Cobb
Slim Summerville as Jailer
J. Edward Bromberg as Mr. Runyan
Brian Donlevy as Barshee
John Carradine as Bob Ford
Donald Meek as McCoy
John Russell as Jesse James, Jr.
Jane Darwell as Mrs. Samuels, James' mother
Charles Tannen as Charles Ford
Claire Du Brey as Mrs. Bob Ford
Willard Robertson as Clarke
Harold Goodwin as Bill
Ernest Whitman as Pinkie
Eddy Waller as Deputy
Paul Burns as Hank
Spencer Charters as Minister
Arthur Aylesworth as Tom Colson
Charles Middleton as Doctor
Charles Halton as Heywood
George Chandler as Roy
Harry Tyler as Farmer
Virginia Brissac as Boy's Mother
Ed Le Saint as Judge Rankin
John Elliott as Judge Mathews
Erville Alderson as Old Marshall
George Breakston as Farmer Boy
Lon Chaney, Jr. as One of James' Gang
Tom London as Soldier (uncredited)
Lorenza Dow Bone as Bartender (uncredited)

Production
Much of the filming for Jesse James took place around the town of Pineville, Missouri in McDonald County, Missouri, because at the time the town and surrounding area looked much the same as it would have in the 1880s and 1890s. The town's historic Old McDonald County Courthouse, a National Register of Historic Places site, was featured in the film serving as a stand in for the Liberty, Missouri courthouse. Pineville still celebrates Jesse James Days annually in homage to the film and the movie stars who descended on the small town to make it. In their off time from filming, the films' stars and crew, including Tyrone Power, Henry Fonda and Randolph Scott, would seek out relaxation at the Shadow Lake resort in Noel, Missouri, on the shores of Elk River (Oklahoma).

Reception
Jesse James was the third highest-grossing film of 1939, behind Gone with the Wind and Mr. Smith Goes to Washington. A sequel, The Return of Frank James, directed by Fritz Lang with Henry Fonda reprising his role as Frank James along with other actors playing the same characters as they had in Jesse James, was released in 1940.

The film was on continuous release in the United States for more than 15 years. The film was reissued in March 1946 and was released for a fourth time in July 1951. By May 1954, it had played over 52,000 bookings in the United States and Canada.

A remake was directed by Nicholas Ray in 1957, The True Story of Jesse James.

Animal cruelty
The film gained a measure of notoriety for a scene in which a horse falls to its death down a rocky slope toward the end of the film. This scene was one of many cited by the American Humane Association against Hollywood's abuse of animals, and led to the association's monitoring of filmmaking. However, according to Leonard Mosley's biography Zanuck: The Rise and Fall of Hollywood's last Tycoon, none of "the horses [had] been injured. Under Zanuck's direction, a short distance down the cliff, on a conveniently broad platform, the unit roper had arranged a soft landing for the horses."

The most difficult riding stunts were performed for high fees by Cliff Lyons who doubled both costars.

See also 
 List of American films of 1939

References

External links 

 
 

1930s biographical films
1930s color films
1930s historical films
1939 Western (genre) films
1939 films
20th Century Fox films
American Western (genre) films
American biographical films
American historical films
Animal cruelty incidents in film
Biographical films about Jesse James
Cultural depictions of Jesse James
Films about bank robbery
Films directed by Henry King
Films produced by Darryl F. Zanuck
Films scored by Louis Silvers
Films set in the 1870s
Films set in the 1880s
Films with screenplays by Nunnally Johnson
James–Younger Gang
Revisionist Western (genre) films
1930s English-language films
1930s American films